Augustus Christian Frederick of Anhalt-Köthen (Köthen, 18 November 1769 – Schloss Geuz, 5 May 1812), was a German prince of the House of Ascania, ruler of the principality of Anhalt-Köthen, and from 1806 the first "Duke of Anhalt-Köthen."

He was the eldest son of Karl George Lebrecht, Prince of Anhalt-Köthen, by his wife Louise Charlotte, daughter of Frederick, Duke of Schleswig-Holstein-Sonderburg-Glücksburg.

Life
After the death of his father in 1789, Augustus Christian Frederick inherited the throne of Anhalt-Köthen. Like him, he pursued a military career in the Prussian army, where he became a Generalmajor.

On 15 May 1803 he was appointed Generalfeldmarschallleutnant and on 31 January 1805 made a knight of the Order of the Black Eagle.

In Frankfurt-am-Main on 9 February 1792 Augustus Christian Frederick married Princess Karoline Friederike of Nassau-Usingen (b. Usingen, 30 August 1777 - d. Hochheim, 28 August 1821), daughter of Frederick Augustus, Prince of Nassau-Usingen and later (1806) Duke of Nassau. After eleven years of an unhappy and childless marriage, they were divorced in 1803.

On 18 April 1806 Napoleon granted him the title "Monsieur d'Anhalt" and with this officially elevated him to the Ducal dignity.

At his death six years later without male issue, Augustus Christian Frederick was succeeded by his infant nephew Louis Augustus Karl Frederick Emil, the son of his deceased younger brother Louis.

1769 births
1812 deaths
People from Köthen (Anhalt)
Princes of Anhalt-Köthen
Generals of the Holy Roman Empire
Dukes of Anhalt-Köthen
Recipients of the Order of the White Eagle (Poland)